Amathyntis is a genus of moths belonging to the family Tineidae.

Species
Amathyntis athyra Meyrick, 1911
Amathyntis catharopa Meyrick, 1911
Amathyntis nucleolata Meyrick, 1911
Amathyntis oporina Meyrick, 1911
Amathyntis physatma Meyrick, 1907

References

Tineidae
Tineidae genera
Taxa named by Edward Meyrick